Mormopterus is a genus of molossid microchiropterans, small flying mammals referred to as free-tailed bats. The genus has been the subject of several revisions, and the diversity of taxa centred on Australia were separated to a new genus Ozimops, and two monotypic genera, Setirostris and Micronomus. The species of Mormopterus, in this stricter sense, are only found in areas outside of Australia and West Papua.

Taxonomy 
A description of the genus was published in 1865 by Wilhelm Peters, as a new subgenus allied to Nyctinomus.

While the species-level taxonomy became better resolved, the integrity of the genus Mormopterus as it stood was less clear and molecular sequencing data indicated that Mormopterus was paraphyletic. The closest relatives of M. kalinowski are members of Nyctinomops. Further phylogenetic work is required to resolve the relationships of the species’ groups from the three regional areas, and what their relationships are to other molossid genera.

Investigations of Australian bat systematics have resulted in species confusion, which has in turn inhibited other research and recognition for the purpose of conservation; Mormopterus had presented the greatest difficulties to taxonomic workers. A revision in 2014 used a multilocus approach, combining morphological and molecular analysis to further separate the genus; this recognised the subgenus Micronomus and erected two new taxa, subgenera Setirostris (monotypic) and Ozimops, which circumscribed four accepted and three new species of Mormopterus. Prior to this revision some taxa were given tentative labels of convenience by workers, Mormopterus sp. 1, 2, 3 ... , following a molecular study in 1998 that identified probable species without publishing descriptions.

The Australian Faunal Directory, citing a 2015 taxonomic publication that elevated subgenera published in a 2014 review, recognises genera Ozimops, Setirostris and Micronomus and the new generic combinations of taxa formerly assigned to this genus.

Diversity 

The genus Mormopterus has seven species occurring in geographically disparate locations, three species from the west Indian Ocean region (Madagascar and the Mascarene Islands and possibly South Africa and Ethiopia), one species from western Indonesia (known from a single specimen from Sumatra) that appears to be related to the above three species; and three species from the neotropics (the western side of South America as far south as northern Chile, and Cuba). The former subgenus Ozimops, later elevated to genus, is most diverse in Australia, although also found in the Indonesian Archipelago, Halmahera, Ambon, Seram and West Papua, and in Papua New Guinea. The two monotypic subgenera Micronomus and Setirostris, also elevated to genus, are endemic to Australia.

Species 
The intergeneric arrangement, prior to 2014 elevation of the four subgenera, may be summarised as:
Subgenus Mormopterus
 Mormopterus acetabulosus Natal free-tailed bat
 Mormopterus francoismoutoui, Reunion free-tailed bat
 Mormopterus doriae Sumatran mastiff bat
 Mormopterus jugularis Peters's wrinkle-lipped bat
 Mormopterus kalinowskii Kalinowski's mastiff bat
 Mormopterus minutus little goblin bat
 Mormopterus phrudus Incan little mastiff bat

Synonyms 
Synonyms of mainly Australian species, later recognised as new genera.
Subgenus Micronomus
Mormopterus norfolkensis East-coast free-tailed bat, 
Subgenus Setirostris
 Mormopterus eleryi bristle-faced free-tailed bat
Subgenus Ozimops
 Mormopterus planiceps, southern free-tailed bat,
 Mormopterus beccarii, Beccari's mastiff bat
 Mormopterus loriae, Loria's mastiff bat, little Papuan mastiff bat
 Mormopterus petersi, inland free-tailed bat
 Mormopterus kitcheneri, south-western free-tailed bat
 Mormopterus ridei, eastern free-tailed bat,
 Mormopterus lumsdenae, northern free-tailed bat
 Mormopterus halli, Cape York free-tailed bat
 Mormopterus cobourgianus, mangrove free-tailed bat

In addition, Peters's flat-headed bat (Platymops setiger) and Roberts's flat-headed bat (Sauromys petrophilus) were once thought to belong to this genus.

References

 
Bats of Australia
Mammals of South Australia
Molossidae
Bat genera
Taxa named by Wilhelm Peters